Cross Keys is an unincorporated community located in Rockingham County, in the U.S. state of Virginia.

Geography 
It is located on State Route 276 south of Harrisonburg.

History 
On June 8, 1862, it was the site of the Battle of Cross Keys, a Confederate victory in Jackson's Valley Campaign during the American Civil War.

Climate
The climate in this area is characterized by hot, humid summers and generally mild to cool winters.  According to the Köppen Climate Classification system, Cross Keys has a humid subtropical climate, abbreviated "Cfa" on climate maps.

Culture
 Ananias Davisson, the publisher of the first Southern shape note tunebook, the Kentucky Harmony (1816), is buried in the Cross Keys cemetery. Davisson was from the Shenandoah Valley, but many of the songs were collected during trips to Kentucky and Tennessee. Many of his musical compositions have been republished in the Shenandoah Harmony, and the annual Northern Shenandoah Valley All Day Shenandoah Harmony Singing typically ends with a visit by singers to the Cross Keys cemetery, where they sing Ananias Davisson's "Retirement" at the graveside of the composer.

References

Unincorporated communities in Rockingham County, Virginia
Unincorporated communities in Virginia